Off The Page is a British discussion programme, broadcast on BBC Radio 4 on Fridays at 11 PM.

The programme features a panel of contributors who tackle a subject on which they are experts. Each panelist writes an introductory column with their take on the week's topic which acts as a springboard for further discussion.

Until 2006 the series was presented by Matthew Parris, who has moved on to Radio 4's biography series Great Lives. He was succeeded by Dominic Arkwright, a radio reporter for the Today programme who has covered conflicts in Afghanistan, Mozambique, Nagorno-Karabakh, Kashmir and Kosovo among others.

The programme is intended to attract listeners who like thoughtful and observant writing and free-flowing uninhibited conversation. It has dealt with subjects such as Kissing Arse; All About Me; The Generation Gap; Stand By Your Man; The Filty Rich; Life in the Margins, and so forth. Off The Page is produced in Bristol.

The edition broadcast at 1:30 p.m. on 3 November 2011 discussed fairies, and included folklorists on the panel: Eddie Lenihan, fairy illustrator Faye Durston and folklorist Juliette Wood. The edition broadcast on 22 November 2011 dealt with Japan.

External links
 

BBC Radio 4 programmes